Amazon (also known as Amazon with Bruce Parry) is a BBC documentary television series co-produced by the Endeavour Productions and Indus Films, and hosted by Bruce Parry.

In the series, Parry—a former British Royal Marine—travels more than 6,000 km down the Amazon River, by boat, light aircraft, and on foot. Over the course of six episodes, he meets and lives with indigenous peoples, coca farmers, loggers, and illegal miners.

The series was released on a two-disc DVD set on 3 November 2008. A book to accompany the series was also published.

Episodes

Songs for Survival

Alongside the Amazon (and the previous Tribe) series a 2-CD album, Songs for Survival, has been released by Kensaltown Records which features a variety of artists such as Mike Oldfield, Johnny Borrell, Hot Chip, The Go! Team, Mystery Jets, and Yusuf Islam.  Every track on the album is exclusive, and has been written especially for the project.  The theme to Amazon is performed by Apparatjik, a supergroup composed of Guy Berryman, Magne Furuholmen, and Jonas Bjerre (of Coldplay, A-ha and Mew respectively).

References

External links
 
 
 Amazon Quiz
 
 Bruce Parry's Favourite Moments, a collection of videos introduced by Bruce Parry on the BBC's Human Planet Explorer

2008 British television series debuts
2008 British television series endings
2000s British documentary television series
BBC television documentaries
English-language television shows